The Last Emperor is the soundtrack album for the movie of the same name. It features nine pieces composed by Ryuichi Sakamoto, five by David Byrne, one from Cong Su, and a few incidental pieces of source music. The album won the Best Original Score award at the 1987 Academy Awards, and won the Best Score Soundtrack for Visual Media award at the 31st Annual Grammy Awards in 1989.

Track listing

Personnel

Production
 Ryuichi Sakamoto – composer, producer, performer
 David Byrne – composer, producer, performer, arranger, mixer
 Cong Su – composer, performer
 Gavyn Wright – conductor
 Aki Ikuta – associate producer
 Hans Zimmer – associate producer, programmer
 Hiro Sugawara – programmer
 Kayo Itose – production secretary
 Ray Williams – music supervisor
 Kōji Ueno – arranger
 Lau Hong Quan – arranger
 Yuji Nomi – arranger

Technical
 Hayden Bendall – engineer
 Mike Jarratt – engineer
 Shinichi Tanaka – engineer
 Clive Martin – engineer
 Ian Sylvester – engineer
 Michio Nakagoshi – engineer
 Shigeru Takise – engineer
 Greg Fulginiti & Greg Calbi – mastering
 Glen Rosenstein – mixer
 Steve Nye – mixer
 Mark Roule – mixer

Charts

References

Ryuichi Sakamoto albums
Biographical film soundtracks
David Byrne soundtracks
1987 soundtrack albums
Virgin Records soundtracks
Albums produced by Ryuichi Sakamoto
Grammy Award for Best Score Soundtrack for Visual Media
Scores that won the Best Original Score Academy Award